Millet Mountain Group is a French-based company, headquartered in Annecy, specializing in outdoor equipment such as backpacks and sleeping bags. In 2014, Millet was acquired by Swiss holding Calida group. In January 2022, Calida agreed to sell Millet to Jean-Pierre Millet, grandson of Millet's founder, and Inspiring Sport Capital (ISC), a private equity company dedicated to the sports industry. Completion of the transaction is expected in the second quarter of 2022. 

Millet also offers a wide variety of other equipment, earning comparisons to United States-based companies such as Timberland and Columbia Sportswear.

Millet is not related to Millets, a UK chain of shops selling outdoor clothing.

References

External links
 Millet (website in English)

Clothing companies established in 1930
Outdoor clothing brands
French brands
Climbing and mountaineering equipment companies
Manufacturing companies established in 1930
French companies established in 1930